is a song by Japanese singer songwriter Mai Kuraki, taken from her fourth compilation album Mai Kuraki Best 151A: Love & Hope (2014). It was released on August 15, 2012, and served as the song to the Japanese animation Case Closed. It was released as a double-A side with "Special Morning Day to You".

Music video
A short version of the official music video was first released on Kuraki's official YouTube account on August 3, 2012. As of February 2018, it has received over 765,000 views on YouTube.

Track listing

Charts

Weekly charts

Monthly charts

Year-end charts

Certification and sales

|-
! scope="row"| Japan (RIAJ)
| 
| 21,970 
|-
|}

Release history

References

2012 songs
2012 singles
Mai Kuraki songs
Songs written by Mai Kuraki
Case Closed songs
Song recordings produced by Daiko Nagato